Elections to Tower Hamlets London Borough Council were held on 3 May 2018, the same day as other borough council elections in London. The directly elected mayor of Tower Hamlets was also up for election.

Prior council composition
Since the 2014 election the makeup of the Borough Council has changed considerably, with the second-placed Tower Hamlets First party removed from the Electoral Commission's register of political parties following election court findings that Tower Hamlets First did not operate any responsible financial scheme, nor in the manners as submitted in its registration as a political party, Lutfur Rahman's re-election to the post of Mayor was declared void, and the subsequent by-election was won by John Biggs of the Labour Party. The Labour Party controlled the council from the time of the by-election in June 2015 until one of its councillors defected to the Liberal Democrats in February 2017 over Brexit. Another of Labour's councillors, who served as the Speaker of the Council, was suspended by the party for 10 months in 2016, and again in March 2018, ending his term as an Independent; he went into the election as a candidate for People's Alliance of Tower Hamlets. Also represented was the Conservative Party.

The 2018 result saw Labour hold the mayoralty and re-gain control of the council, winning all but one of the seats won by Tower Hamlets First in 2014, as well as seats from the Conservatives. Rabina Khan, formerly of Tower Hamlets First, but now leader of the rival PATH, came second in the Mayoral election and was the only former Tower Hamlets First councillor to win a seat.

Electoral wards

The election was held on the boundaries established by the Tower Hamlets (Electoral Changes) Order 2013, which reduced the size of the council and created new electoral wards. This was the second election on the new boundaries, after the 2014 election.

Overall results

|}

Results by ward

Bethnal Green

Blackwall and Cubitt Town
In October 2018, Pappu was suspended from the Labour group on the council on following a tirade of antisemitic posts on his social media. He subsequently apologised and was readmitted to the Labour Party.

Bow East

Bow West

Bromley North

Bromley South

Canary Wharf
In February 2020, Wood resigned as Leader of the Opposition and as a Conservative in opposition to Brexit and the Housing Secretary, Robert Jenrick's decision to approve the building of the Westferry Printworks skyscrapers. He now sits as an Independent.

Island Gardens

Lansbury

Limehouse

Mile End

Poplar

Shadwell
In October 2018, Khan joined the Liberal Democrats after the People's Alliance of Tower Hamlets folded.

Spitalfields and Banglatown

St Dunstan's

St Katharine's and Wapping

St Peter's

Stepney Green

Weavers

Whitechapel

By elections 2018–2022

Notes

References

2018
2018 London Borough council elections
21st century in the London Borough of Tower Hamlets